The 1954–55 NBA season was the ninth season of the National Basketball Association. The season ended with the Syracuse Nationals winning the NBA Championship, beating the Fort Wayne Pistons 4 games to 3 in the NBA Finals.

Notable occurrences
 In response to the relatively slow pace of games, the NBA introduced a 24-second shot clock. The shot clock revitalized the game and scoring skyrocketed league-wide.
 The Baltimore Bullets dropped out of the NBA and folded on November 27, 1954 after playing 14 games (record 3 wins 11 loses), the last time (as of 2021) that an NBA franchise has folded; these games and all statistics were deleted from the NBA's records. The NBA would return to Baltimore when the Chicago Zephyrs relocated there as the "new" Bullets for the 1963–64 season, though the franchise would relocate to Washington in 1973, where they remain today as the Washington Wizards.
 As a result of Baltimore having folded, the NBA schedule was redrafted so each team now played 12 games against divisional opponents, and 9 games against the four teams in the other division, for a total of 72 games.
 The 1955 NBA All-Star Game was played in New York City, with the East beating the West 100–91. Bill Sharman of the Boston Celtics won the game's MVP award.
 NBC began televising NBA games. This continued until the 1962–63 season, when ABC took over. NBC would begin televising NBA games again in 1990.
 The Milwaukee Hawks played their final season in the Wisconsin city before moving to St. Louis, Missouri the following season. The NBA would return to Milwaukee with the expansion Bucks in 1968.

Final standings

Eastern Division

Western Division

x – clinched playoff spot

Playoffs

Statistics leaders

Note: Prior to the 1969–70 season, league leaders in points, rebounds, and assists were determined by totals rather than averages.

NBA awards
Rookie of the Year: Bob Pettit, Milwaukee Hawks

All-NBA First Team:
 Neil Johnston, Philadelphia Warriors
 Dolph Schayes, Syracuse Nationals
 Bob Cousy, Boston Celtics
 Bob Pettit, Milwaukee Hawks
 Larry Foust, Fort Wayne Pistons

All-NBA Second Team:
Harry Gallatin, New York Knicks
Slater Martin, Minneapolis Lakers
Vern Mikkelsen, Minneapolis Lakers
Paul Seymour, Syracuse Nationals
Bill Sharman, Boston Celtics

References
1954–55 NBA Season Summary basketball-reference.com. Retrieved December 10, 2010